Lawrence Henry Gowan (born 22 November 1956) is a Scottish born Canadian singer and keyboardist. He was born in Glasgow  and raised in the Toronto suburb of Scarborough, Ontario. Gowan has been both a solo artist and lead vocalist and keyboardist of the band Styx since May 1999. His musical style is usually classified in the categories of pop and progressive rock.

Career
At the age of 19, he earned an ARCT in classical piano performance from The Royal Conservatory of Music, in Toronto, Ontario. Upon graduation, he enjoyed modest local success with the band Rhinegold in 1976.

After the band broke up five years later, Gowan began a solo career under the stage name Gowan, releasing his first album under that name in 1982, which was produced by Rob Freeman and featured Kim Mitchell of Max Webster on guitar. This album contained the singles "Victory", "Give In" and "Keep Up the Fight".

After his 1982 debut album Gowan did not fare well, Gowan "found himself naturally gravitating" to the Queen Street West music scene that was developing in Toronto in the mid 1980s. Still signed to Columbia Records, the label agreed to fund his next album. Gowan spent a year writing songs, and also travelled to Scotland and Ireland to trace his heritage. While there, he received a telephone call from English record producer David Tickle, who said he would produce the album and arranged a recording session. Tickle secured the services of several session musicians from the backing band of Peter Gabriel for the recording session, including bassist Tony Levin, drummer Jerry Marotta, and guitarist David Rhodes. The album Strange Animal was recorded at Startling Studios owned by Ringo Starr. Gowan's 1985 album Strange Animal was his commercial breakthrough in Canada. The album spawned the hit singles "A Criminal Mind", "(You're a) Strange Animal", "Guerilla Soldier" and "Cosmetics". That year he won a CASBY Award for most promising male artist.

His 1987 follow up Great Dirty World gave him another hit single with "Moonlight Desires", featuring Jon Anderson (from Yes) on backing vocals, as well as "Dedication".

Although he was very successful in Canada, all three of Gowan's albums had been issued in the US to virtually no attention, and he was dropped by Columbia Records.  1990's Lost Brotherhood, recorded at Metalworks Studios in Mississauga, Ontario, had a harder rock sound, and featured such players as Red Rider member Ken Greer, former Coney Hatch guitarist Steve Shelski and Rush's Alex Lifeson.  It produced the singles "Lost Brotherhood", "All the Lovers in the World", and "Out of a Deeper Hunger".  This was Gowan's first album for Anthem Records.

A few bars from "The Dragon" can be heard playing on a car radio in the 1990 movie "Navy Seals" and appears on the original motion picture soundtrack.

He released the more acoustic ...But You Can Call Me Larry in 1993 under his full name, returning to the Canadian pop charts with "When There's Time for Love", "Soul's Road" and "Dancing on My Own Ground". International success was not forthcoming, though, and Anthem dropped Gowan from their roster.  He subsequently released The Good Catches Up independently in 1995, which featured the single "Guns and God", which received moderate airplay in Canada. Also that same year, Gowan was part of an all-star lineup at Toronto's Massey Hall to celebrate Ronnie Hawkins' 60th birthday, as documented on the album Let It Rock, sharing the stage with veteran rockers Jerry Lee Lewis, Carl Perkins and The Band. In 1997, Gowan released two live CDs: Sololive – No Kilt Tonight containing a rendition of Ragtime's classic "King Chanticleer Rag", and Au Québec with a cover of Harmonium's "Pour un instant" as well as his first composition in French, "Stéphanie", for his fan base in Quebec.

In 1997, Gowan released "Healing Waters" as a tribute to Diana, Princess of Wales after her death.  "Healing Waters" was initially an unreleased song from Gowan, though it was used in its original form in the 1995 Jeff Wincott movie, When the Bullet Hits the Bone.

In 1998, Gowan was the recipient of the National Achievement Award at the annual SOCAN Awards in Toronto.

His song "A Criminal Mind" was covered in 2005 by Canadian hip-hop artist Maestro; Gowan appears in the video and his vocals are sampled on the track. The song was also covered by Canadian gypsy jazz music group The Lost Fingers. The song was sampled in a song performed by Akon and Freck Billionaire.

He also guest-starred on the Canadian animated comedy series Chilly Beach.

In February 2006, Gowan did four orchestra-accompanied concerts in London, Ontario and Kitchener, Ontario. Also in 2006, his home was featured on MTV's Cribs.

In March 2010, Gowan released "Return of the Strange Animal", a remastered version of 1985's "Strange Animal" plus a making-of documentary and music videos on DVD. In May 2010, Gowan performed two solo shows in support of the 25th anniversary of the "Strange Animal" album.

In May 2012, Gowan re-issued a remastered version of 1987's "Great Dirty World".

As of 2012, Gowan was recording a new solo album which he hoped to have completed sometime in 2013, but has yet to be released.

Gowan acquired the master tapes to his catalogue from CBS Records International in the 2010s, and assigned them to Linus Entertainment under the True North Records label.

On 11 October 2012, Gowan appeared on episode 29 of John Wants Answers.

On 13 October 2013, Gowan played a solo concert, titled 'In Kilt Tonight' at the Glenn Gould Studio in Toronto, Ontario, Canada. All proceeds were donated to McDermott House Canada, a charitable organization.

Styx

In 1997, during Styx's tour, Gowan performed as a supporting act for Styx at Montreal's Molson Centre and Quebec City's Colisée.

Tommy Shaw admired his talent and vibrant stage charisma, and called him in May 1999 asking him to tour with them for 53 dates, temporarily replacing their lead singer Dennis DeYoung who was ill. Eventually Gowan permanently replaced the lead singer. Since then, Gowan's classic hit, "A Criminal Mind", is often played by Styx.

Styx had long been plagued by differences in artistic inclination. DeYoung's absence created an opportunity for a more permanent restructuring of Styx. Gowan subsequently became the band's permanent vocalist.

Styx's 2003 album Cyclorama was Gowan's first studio album with the band.  Gowan sings two songs on Cyclorama, "Fields of the Brave" and "More Love for the Money", both of which have an easily recognizable Gowan signature. He then continued recording with Styx for their 2005 album, Big Bang Theory.

Gowan continues with Styx to the present and is featured on many live releases from the band. The band released studio recordings of older Styx songs with the new line-up, titled Regeneration (released in two volumes in 2010 and 2011), and Gowan sings lead vocals on several tracks that were originally recorded by Dennis DeYoung.

In May 2017, Styx announced their new album The Mission and revealed the first single "Gone, Gone, Gone" featuring Gowan on lead vocals. On the album, Gowan also does lead vocals for "The Greater Good", "Time May Bend", and "The Outpost". He also composed an instrumental piece that he told the other band members doesn't have a name yet. He was playing it for his dad one time, and he asked Larry what the name was, and he said it doesn't have a name yet, and when he looked down he saw a picture of the ship that his dad was in when he was in the royal navy in World War II and the name of the ship was Khedive which meant Egyptian ruler. He said it was a fitting name so he gave it that name, and decided to release it on The Mission.

Awards and nominations
The following are Gowan's Juno nominations:

1983 – Nominated – "Most Promising Male Vocalist of the Year"
1985 – Winner – "Best Video" for "A Criminal Mind" with director Rob Quartly animation and direction by Greg Duffell / Lightbox Studios Inc.
1985 – Winner – "Best Album Graphics" for Strange Animal (awarded to designers Rob MacIntyre and Dimo Safari)
1985 – Nominated – "Male Vocalist of the Year"
1985 – Nominated – "Album of the Year" for Strange Animal
1985 – Nominated – "Best Selling Single" for "A Criminal Mind"
1985 – Nominated – "Best Video" for "You're a Strange Animal" animation by Greg Duffell / Lightbox Studios Inc.
1986 – Nominated – "Best Video" for "Cosmetics" (director: Rob Quartly)
1987 – Nominated – "Male Vocalist of the Year"
1987 – Nominated – "Album of the Year" for Great Dirty World
1987 – Nominated – "Canadian Entertainer of the Year"
1991 – Nominated – "Male Vocalist of the Year"

In 1995, Gowan was presented with the SOCAN award for songs that have won major airplay in 1995 for his song, "Dancing on My Own Ground".

On 16 November 1998, Gowan received the National Achievement Award from the Society of Composers, Authors and Music Publishers of Canada (SOCAN).

In 2003, Gowan was presented with the SOCAN award (along with three other musicians) for songs that have surpassed the 100,000 radio-airplay mark for his song, "Moonlight Desires".

In 2011, Gowan was presented with a star on the Scarborough Walk of Fame – Entertainment.

In 2013, Gowan announced he was recording a new studio album, complete with new original material.  The album is apparently in production in downtown Toronto at a private studio.  According to Gowan, the album is based on an old concept album by Rhinegold, which was written and conceived in the mid-1970s, during their rounds of the Toronto club scene.

In 2018, Gowan's song "A Criminal Mind" was certified as a Platinum Single in Canada, surpassing a combined 80,000 physical 7" and digital downloaded units sold. Gowan was presented with the plaque on stage at his show in Windsor, Ontario at The Colosseum at Caesars Windsor .

Members
 Lawrence Gowan – lead vocals, keyboards, guitar
 Danny J. Ricardo – guitar (2010–2014)
 Ricky Tillo – guitar (2016)
 Bob McAlpine- guitar (2017)
 Pete Nunn – keyboards (2010–2013)
 Emm Gryner – keyboards, backing vocals (2014)
 Ryan Bovaird – keyboards (2016)
 Terry Gowan – bass, backing vocals
 Todd Sucherman – drums, percussion
 Taylor Mills – backing vocals (2010–2012)
 Divine Brown – backing vocals (2016)
 SATE (Saidah Baba Talibah) – backing vocals (2017)

Personal life
Gowan is  married to Jan Gowan and has two children.

Discography

Solo albums

Live albums
Solo Live: No Kilt Tonight (1996)
Gowan au Québec (1997)

Compilation albums
Best of... (1997)
Home Field (1998)

DVDs
Gowan Live in Concert (2006)

with Styx

Studio albums
Cyclorama (2003)
Big Bang Theory (2005)
The Mission (2017)
Crash of the Crown (2021)

Live albums
 Arch Allies: Live at Riverport (2000)
 Styx World: Live 2001 (2001)
 At the River's Edge: Live in St. Louis (2002)
 21st Century Live (2003)
 One with Everything: Styx and the Contemporary Youth Orchestra (2006)
 The Grand Illusion/Pieces of Eight - Live (2012)
 Live at the Orleans Arena, Las Vegas (2015)

Solo singles

References

External links
 (Gowan Official)
 (Styx)

1956 births
Canadian male singer-songwriters
Canadian rock pianists
Canadian rock keyboardists
Canadian rock singers
Canadian singer-songwriters
Canadian tenors
Living people
Musicians from Glasgow
Musicians from Toronto
People from Scarborough, Toronto
The Royal Conservatory of Music alumni
Scottish emigrants to Canada
Styx (band) members
Canadian new wave musicians
Canadian male pianists
20th-century Canadian male singers
21st-century Canadian singers
21st-century Canadian male singers